Coccinella (from the Latin "coccinella", ladybird) is a free and open-source cross-platform client for the XMPP/Jabber-instant messaging-protocol.

The software is written in the Tcl/Tk language, and it runs under BSD, Linux, Mac OS X, Solaris, Windows and all other platforms that support Tcl/Tk. Mats Bengtsson published it in 1999, under the name Whiteboard. It was renamed Coccinella in 2003.

Features 
 MUC (Multi-User Chat)
 Whiteboard
 encrypted connections
 configurable Design (Themes/Skins)
 Unicode
 Userinterface with Tabs
 Eventsignaling by Sound
 VoIP-support over XMPP-Jingle-Extension
 Emoticons
 Typing Notification (see, when your peer-user is typing)
 Icon in system tray
 Avatars
 Filetransfer
 Mac OS X-notificationsystem Growl supported

See also 
 Comparison of instant messaging clients

References

External links 
 
 official development
 

XMPP clients
Free instant messaging clients
Free VoIP software
Free software projects
Free software programmed in Tcl
Instant messaging clients for Linux
MacOS Internet software
Windows instant messaging clients
1999 software
Software that uses Tk (software)